Strzelce Małe may refer to the following places:
Strzelce Małe, Greater Poland Voivodeship (west-central Poland)
Strzelce Małe, Lesser Poland Voivodeship (south Poland)
Strzelce Małe, Łódź Voivodeship (central Poland)